Bagby Branch is a stream in Howard and Randolph counties in the U.S. state of Missouri. It is a tributary of Silver Creek.

Bagby Branch, historically called "Bagby's Creek" has the name of the local Bagby family.

See also
List of rivers of Missouri

References

Rivers of Howard County, Missouri
Rivers of Randolph County, Missouri
Rivers of Missouri